Darius Slayton (born January 12, 1997) is an American football wide receiver for the New York Giants of the National Football League (NFL). He played college football at Auburn and was drafted by the Giants in the fifth round of the 2019 NFL Draft.

Early years
Slayton attended and played high school football at Greater Atlanta Christian School.

College career
Slayton attended and played college football at Auburn University. He redshirted in 2015 and contributed on the field from 2016–18.

Collegiate statistics

Professional career 

Slayton was drafted by the New York Giants in the fifth round, 171st overall, of the 2019 NFL Draft. He was the 18th wide receiver taken that year.

2019
In Slayton's first NFL game, a Week 3  32–31 victory over the Tampa Bay Buccaneers, he had three receptions for 82 yards from fellow 2019 NFL draft pick Daniel Jones. In his third game, a 28–10 loss to the Minnesota Vikings, he scored a 35-yard touchdown. In Week 8 against the Detroit Lions, Slayton caught two passes for 50 yards, both of which ended up being touchdowns, in the 31–26 loss. During Week 10 against the New York Jets, Slayton finished with 10 catches for 121 receiving yards and two touchdowns as the Giants lost 27–34. During Monday Night Football against the Philadelphia Eagles in Week 14, Slayton finished with five catches, all in the first half, for 154 receiving yards and two touchdowns as the Giants lost 17–23 in overtime. Overall, Slayton finished his rookie season with 48 receptions for 740 receiving yards and eight receiving touchdowns, leading the Giants in receiving yards for the 2019 season.

2020
In the Giants' 2020 regular season opener against the Pittsburgh Steelers on Monday Night Football, Slayton had six receptions for 102 receiving yards and two receiving touchdowns during the 26–16 loss.
In Week 5 against the Dallas Cowboys, Slayton recorded eight catches for 129 yards during the 37–34 loss.

2021
In the Giants' Week 2 game against the Washington Football Team, Slayton finished with three receptions for 54 yards and a touchdown, but dropped a pass in the end zone in the 4th quarter.

2022
In Week 10 game against the Houston Texans, Slayton averaged 31.7 yards per catch, a career-high for a single game. He also had a 54 yard touchdown and finished with 3 receptions for 95 yards and a touchdown in the 24-16 win. He finished the season with 46 catches for 724 yards and two touchdowns through 16 games and 11 starts.

2023
On March 16, 2023, Slayton signed a two-year contract extension with the Giants.

NFL career statistics

References

External links

New York Giants bio
Auburn Tigers bio

1997 births
Living people
African-American players of American football
People from Norcross, Georgia
Sportspeople from the Atlanta metropolitan area
Players of American football from Georgia (U.S. state)
American football wide receivers
Auburn Tigers football players
New York Giants players
21st-century African-American sportspeople